District 8 Jakarta is a mixed development complex of 11 towers at Sudirman Central Business District, and adjacent Senopati area in South Jakarta, Indonesia. The 
tallest building of this complex is Treasury Tower. Total land area of the complex is about 4.8 hectares. The complex has a retail area of about 15,000 square meters, dubbed Astha shopping mall.

The complex is being developed by Agung Sedayu Group. Most of its buildings were topped out by January 2017. The first Langham Hotel and Residence in South East Asia will be located in the complex. 
A serviced apartment building will be operated by Oakwood. As of October 2021, the third tallest building in Jakarta,  Treasury Tower is located within this complex.
 
Skyscrapers of District 8 Jakarta complex are as follows,

See also

 List of tallest buildings in Indonesia
List of tallest buildings in Jakarta

External links
Official website

References

Buildings and structures in Jakarta
Skyscrapers in Indonesia
Residential skyscrapers in Indonesia
Skyscraper hotels
Skyscraper office buildings in Indonesia